Schuylkill Township is a township in Schuylkill County, Pennsylvania. The population was 1,076 at the 2020 census.

History
The Tamaqua Historic District was listed on the National Register of Historic Places in 1991.

Geography
According to the U.S. Census Bureau, the township has a total area of 9.8 square miles (25.5 km2), all  land.

Demographics

At the 2000 census there were 1,123 people, 503 households, and 345 families living in the township.  The population density was 114.2 people per square mile (44.1/km2).  There were 568 housing units at an average density of 57.8/sq mi (22.3/km2).  The racial makeup of the township was 99.38% White, 0.09% African American, 0.27% Native American, 0.09% Asian, and 0.18% from two or more races. Hispanic or Latino of any race were 0.09%.

Of the 503 households 18.9% had children under the age of 18 living with them, 53.5% were married couples living together, 9.1% had a female householder with no husband present, and 31.4% were non-families. 28.4% of households were one person and 18.3% were one person aged 65 or older.  The average household size was 2.23 and the average family size was 2.70.

The age distribution was 15.8% under the age of 18, 5.4% from 18 to 24, 25.6% from 25 to 44, 29.5% from 45 to 64, and 23.7% 65 or older.  The median age was 47 years. For every 100 females there were 93.6 males. For every 100 females age 18 and over, there were 91.1 males.

The median household income was $32,098 and the median family income  was $38,182. Males had a median income of $35,417 versus $21,250 for females. The per capita income for the township was $16,452. About 6.9% of families and 6.6% of the population were below the poverty line, including 6.9% of those under age 18 and 7.9% of those age 65 or over.

Gallery

References

Townships in Pennsylvania
Townships in Schuylkill County, Pennsylvania